Zabrđe may refer to:

Bosnia and Herzegovina 
 Zabrđe (Ugljevik)
 Zabrđe (Kiseljak)
 Zabrđe (Konjic)
 Zabrđe (Kotor Varoš)

Croatia 
 Zabrđe, Croatia, a village near Ston

Montenegro 
 Zabrđe, Andrijevica
 Zabrđe, Cetinje
 Zabrđe, Plužine, a village near Plužine

Serbia 
 Zabrđe (Novi Pazar)
 Zabrđe (Petrovac)
 Zabrđe (Priboj)
 Zabrđe (Sjenica)